Paid Educational Leave Convention, 1974 is an International Labour Organization Convention.

It was established in 1974:
Considering that paid educational leave should be conceived in terms of a policy of continuing education and training to be implemented progressively and in an effective manner, and

Having decided upon the adoption of certain proposals with regard to paid educational leave, ...

Ratifications
As of 2022, the treaty has been ratified by 35 states.

External links 
Text.
Ratifications.

Education treaties
International Labour Organization conventions
Treaties concluded in 1974
Treaties entered into force in 1976
1974 in education
Leave of absence
Treaties of Czechoslovakia
Treaties of Yugoslavia
Treaties of the Democratic Republic of Afghanistan
Treaties of Azerbaijan
Treaties of Belgium
Treaties of Belize
Treaties of Bosnia and Herzegovina
Treaties of Brazil
Treaties of Chile
Treaties of Cuba
Treaties of the Czech Republic
Treaties of Finland
Treaties of France
Treaties of West Germany
Treaties of Guinea
Treaties of Guyana
Treaties of the Hungarian People's Republic
Treaties of Ba'athist Iraq
Treaties of Kenya
Treaties of Mexico
Treaties of Montenegro
Treaties of the Netherlands
Treaties of Nicaragua
Treaties of the Polish People's Republic
Treaties of Russia
Treaties of San Marino
Treaties of Serbia and Montenegro
Treaties of Slovakia
Treaties of Slovenia
Treaties of North Macedonia
Treaties of Spain
Treaties of Sweden
Treaties of Tanzania
Treaties of Ukraine
Treaties of the United Kingdom
Treaties of Venezuela
Treaties of Zimbabwe
Treaties extended to Anguilla
Treaties extended to Jersey
Treaties extended to Aruba
1974 in labor relations